The Library District is an officially designated neighborhood in Downtown Kansas City, Missouri, United States, roughly bounded by 9th and 11th Streets on the north and south and Main Street and Broadway on the east and west. The District contains a sub-district named the West Ninth Street/Baltimore Avenue Historic District listed on the National Register and which includes several buildings individually listed on the National Register of Historic Places. It also contains other notable structures not listed on the National Register.

History of the Library District

Originally developed as a commercial and entertainment area in the 1880s, the Library District took its new name in 2003 in connection with the move of the Kansas City Public Library's Central Branch to the former headquarters of the First National Bank of Kansas City, presently the Central Library. At the same time, many commercial office buildings nearby were converted to loft apartment residences and the City of Kansas City initiated major streetscape improvements within the district. Together, these changes established a distinctive character for the neighborhood.

Distinctive features
The Library District has a walking tour guide available through the Kansas City Public Library's website. The walking tour guide begins at the steps of the Library's public garage on 10th Street, between Wyandotte Street and Baltimore Avenue.

Library district buildings on the National Register of Historic Places

 Central Library (First National Bank Building, 1880)
 Bunker Building (1881)
 Old New England Building (1887–88)
 New York Life Building (1888)
 Savoy Hotel and Grill (1888)
 Graphic Arts Building (1917)
 Land Bank Building (1923–24)

Other historic Library District buildings 
 The Kansas City Club (The University Club of Kansas City, 1922)
 The Kansas City School of Law (1926)

The Kansas City Library District Garage "Community Bookshelf" 

The Central Library's parking garage has a distinctive facade on 10th Street, using images of 22 9-meter-high bookspines to create a "community bookshelf."  The garage was created by architect Brian M. Finn when he was with the architectural firm CDFM2 in 2003.  The signage firm Dimensional Innovations made the Mylar bookends and postcard images, and local residents got to choose which titles would be represented in the bookshelf. The Wyandotte Street facade includes enlarged historic postcards with images of 10th Street and 9th Street from the early 1900s.  The Baltimore Avenue facade next to the Kansas City Club includes giant banners with images of the Great Hall of the Library of Congress' Jefferson Building and a fanciful image of a gathering of famous Kansas Citians in an architectural fantasy by local artist Bob Holloway.  
The 22 "Community Bookshelf" book titles (in order from West to East on 10th street):
Kansas City Stories, Volume I
Kansas City, Missouri; Its History and Its People 1808-1908 (Carrie Westlake Whitney) 1908
Tom’s Town, Kansas City and the Pendergast Legend (William M. Reddig) 1986
Goin’ to Kansas City (Nathan W. Pearson, Jr.) 1987
Farm: A Year in the Life of an American Farmer (Rhodes) 1989
Mr. Anonymous, the Story of William Volker (Herbert C. Cornuelle) 1951
Kansas City, Missouri: An Architectural History, 1826 - 1990 (George Ehrlich) 1992
Journeys Through Time: A Young Traveler’s Guide to Kansas City’s History (Monroe Dodd, Daniel Serda) 2000
Kansas City Stories, Volume II
Virgil Thomson, a Reader: Selected Writings 1924-1984 (Thomson) 2002
Mrs. Bridge (Connell) 1959
I Was Right on Time (O'Neil) 1996
The O’Donnells (Peggy Sullivan) 1956
Independence Avenue (Eileen Sherman) 1990
Stella Louella’s Runaway Book (Lisa Campbell Ernst) 1998
PrairyErth: (A Deep Map) (Least Heat-Moon) 1991
Messages from my Father (Calvin Trillin) 1996
Catch-22 (Heller)
Children's Stories
Goodnight Moon (Brown, pictures by Hurd)
Harold and the Purple Crayon (Johnson)
Winnie the Pooh (Milne)
Green Eggs and Ham (Dr. Seuss)
What a Wonderful World (Weiss, Thiele, pictures by Bryan) 1995
Little House on the Prairie (Wilder)
The Wonderful Wizard of Oz (Baum)
M. C. Higgins, the Great (Hamilton)
Silent Spring (Carson)
O Pioneers! (Cather)
Cien Años de Soledad (Marquez)
Their Eyes Were Watching God (Hurston)
Fahrenheit 451 (Bradbury)
The Republic (Plato)
The Adventures of Huckleberry Finn (Twain)
(Building Entrance)
Tao Te Ching (Lao Tzu)
The Collected Poems of Langston Hughes (Hughes)
Black Elk Speaks (Neihardt)
Invisible Man (Ellison)
To Kill a Mockingbird (Lee)
Journals of the Expedition (Lewis, Clark) + Undaunted Courage (Ambrose)
The Lord of the Rings (Tolkien)
A Tale of Two Cities (Dickens)
Charlotte's Web (White)
Romeo and Juliet (Shakespeare)
Truman (McCullough)

Further reading
 George Ehrlich, Kansas City, Missouri: An Architectural History, (Kansas City: Historic Kansas City Foundation, 1979)
 Millstein, Cydney. “West Ninth Street Baltimore Avenue Historic District Boundary Increase I, Kansas City, Missouri.” National Register of Historic Places Nomination, 2001.
 Millstein, Cydney. Library District Walking Tour Guide.  Kansas City Public Library.  2004

References 

 
Historic districts in Missouri
Neighborhoods in Kansas City, Missouri
Downtown Kansas City